Tso-Ping Ma was a Chinese-American electronic engineer and professor of electrical engineering and applied physics at Yale University, USA.

Early life
Tso-Ping Ma was born in Lanzhou, China in 1945, but later moved to live and study in Taiwan. After graduating from National Taiwan University, he moved to live and study in the United States. He completed his Ph.D. degree from Yale University in 1974.

Career
Tso-Ping joined IBM from 1975-77. In 1977, he joined the Department of Electrical Engineering, Yale University as a faculty member. In 1985, he became a professor. His research focuses on semiconductor devices, logic and memory technologies.

Awards
Tso-Ping become an IEEE Fellow in 1994. He received the Paul Rapport Award of the IEEE Electronic Device Society in 1998. In 2003, he was elected to the US National Academy of Engineering. In 2005, he received the IEEE Andrew Grove Award.  In 2008, he received the Connecticut Medal of Technology award. In 2009, he was elected a foreign member of the Chinese Academy of Sciences. In 2012, he was elected a member of Taiwan's Academia Sinica. In 2016, he received an honorary doctorate from National Chiao Tung University, Taiwan.

Death
Tso-Ping passed away peacefully on April 6, 2021, at the age of 75, after a brief battle with cancer.

References 

Living people
National Taiwan University alumni
Yale University alumni
Yale University faculty
IBM employees
Fellow Members of the IEEE
Members of the Chinese Academy of Sciences
Members of the United States National Academy of Engineering
1945 births